El Sauzal is a village and municipality in Chaco Province in northern Argentina.

References

Populated places in Chaco Province